Magway Region Hluttaw is the legislature of the Burmese region of Magway Region. It is a unicameral body, consisting of 68 members, including 51 elected members and 17 military representatives.  As of February 2016, the Hluttaw was led by speaker Tar of the National League for Democracy (NLD).

As of the 2015 general election, the National League for Democracy (NLD) won every contested seat in the legislature, based on the most recent election results.

General Election results (Nov. 2015)

See also
State and Region Hluttaws
Pyidaungsu Hluttaw

References

Unicameral legislatures
Magway Region
Legislatures of Burmese states and regions